The marlin is a large billfish sometimes also known as the spearfish.

Marlin may also refer to:

Places
Marlín, Castile-Leon, a village in Spain
Marlin, Texas, city in Falls County, Texas, United States

Sports
Cincinnati Marlins, a swim team based in Cincinnati, Ohio
Miami Marlins, a Major League Baseball team based in Miami, Florida

Technology
MarLIN, Marine Life Information Network
Marlin (DRM), a Digital Rights Management technology
Marlin (firmware), for RepRap based 3D printers, forked from the Sprinter firmware
Marlin, code name for Linspire Five-0, a Linux distribution
Marlin, code name for the Google Pixel XL

Vehicles
Marlin (car), a British sports car maker
Marlin (dinghy), a small 2-3 crew sailing dinghy designed by Ian Proctor
P5M Marlin, a Cold War patrol bomber of the US Navy
Rambler Marlin, an American automobile of the 1960s
, a Liberian steamship in service 1963-65
, two ships of the United States Navy

Other uses
Marlin (magazine), an American magazine devoted to big game fishing
Marlin (name)
Marlin Firearms, a manufacturer of rifles and shotguns
.444 Marlin
.450 Marlin
Marlin Model 336
Marlin Records, a record label
Marlin, a character in the Finding Nemo franchise

See also
Marlon (disambiguation)
Marling (disambiguation)